Jerry Beck (born November 13, 1957) is an American former professional basketball player. During the 1980s and 1990s, he played in the Netherlands but is better known for his collegiate career at Middle Tennessee State University. Between 1978–79 and 1981–82, Beck scored 1,401 points, grabbed 782 rebounds and was twice named the Ohio Valley Conference Men's Basketball Player of the Year. In addition, Beck was selected three straight years to the All-OVC First Team.

A  multi-position player who primarily switched between small forward and power forward, Beck led the Blue Raiders to the school's first ever NCAA Tournament appearance in 1982. In a first round match-up against perennial title contender Kentucky, he recorded a double-double with 14 points and 10 rebounds to lead MT to arguably its biggest win in school history. They defeated the Wildcats, 50–44, thereby spoiling a much-anticipated second round match-up between Kentucky and Louisville. The Blue Raiders lost to Louisville by 25 points the following game.

Years later, in a Murfreesboro Post column that ranked the top ten men's basketball players in MT history, they selected Beck as the #1 greatest player. Following college, the Milwaukee Bucks selected him in the fourth round (89th overall) in the 1982 NBA Draft, although Beck decided to play internationally in the Netherlands. He played in the Netherlands until age 42, at which point he retired and became a permanent resident in Amsterdam.

References

Living people
American expatriate basketball people in the Netherlands
American men's basketball players
Basketball players from Tennessee
B.S. Leiden players
Dutch Basketball League players
Middle Tennessee Blue Raiders men's basketball players
Milwaukee Bucks draft picks
Place of birth missing (living people)
Power forwards (basketball)
Small forwards
Basketball players from Amsterdam
Wisconsin Flyers players
ZZ Leiden players
Heroes Den Bosch players
BV Den Helder players
DAS Delft players
SV Tonego players
1957 births